Sandavágur Church is a distinctive red-roofed church in the town of Sandavágur in the Faroe Islands.

History
The church of Sandavá was consecrated on April 29, 1917. It was the fifth in a series of churches built in the last 300 years.

A memorial was erected outside the church to one of the many ships that were sunk during the Second World War.

References

External links
Sandavagur at Faroeislands.dk

Churches in the Faroe Islands